Clara Tauson was the defending champion but chose not to participate.

Mirra Andreeva won the title, defeating Rebecca Peterson in the final, 6–1, 6–4.

Seeds

Draw

Finals

Top half

Bottom half

References

External Links
Main Draw

Meitar Open - Singles